Poeciloderas quadripunctatus is a species of horse flies in the family Tabanidae.

Distribution
Mexico to Argentina.

References

Tabanidae
Diptera of South America
Diptera of North America
Taxa named by Johan Christian Fabricius
Insects described in 1805